Henri Lefebvre (16 June 1901 – 29 June 1991) was a French Marxist philosopher and sociologist, best known for pioneering the critique of everyday life, for introducing the concepts of the right to the city and the production of social space, and for his work on dialectical materialism, alienation, and criticism of Stalinism, existentialism, and structuralism. In his prolific career, Lefebvre wrote more than sixty books and three hundred articles. He founded or took part in the founding of several intellectual and academic journals such as Philosophies, La Revue Marxiste, Arguments, Socialisme ou Barbarie, Espaces et Sociétés.

Biography
Lefebvre was born in Hagetmau, Landes, France. He studied philosophy at the University of Paris (the Sorbonne), graduating in 1920. By 1924 he was working with Paul Nizan, Norbert Guterman, Georges Friedmann, Georges Politzer, and Pierre Morhange in the Philosophies group seeking a "philosophical revolution". This brought them into contact with the Surrealists, Dadaists, and other groups, before they moved towards the French Communist Party (PCF).

Lefebvre joined the PCF in 1928 and became one of the most prominent French Marxist intellectuals during the second quarter of the 20th century, before joining the French resistance. From 1944 to 1949, he was the director of Radiodiffusion Française, a French radio broadcaster in Toulouse. Among his works was a highly influential, anti-Stalinist text on dialectics called Dialectical Materialism (1940). Seven years later, Lefebvre published his first volume of The Critique of Everyday Life. His early work on method was applauded and borrowed centrally by the philosopher Jean-Paul Sartre in Critique of Dialectical Reason (1960). During Lefebvre's thirty-year stint with the PCF, he was chosen to publish critical attacks on opposed theorists, especially existentialists like Sartre and Lefebvre's former colleague Nizan, only to intentionally get himself expelled from the party for his own heterodox theoretical and political opinions in the late 1950s. He then went from serving as a primary intellectual for the PCF to becoming one of France's most important critics of the PCF's politics (e.g. immediately, the lack of an opinion on Algeria, and more generally, the partial apologism for and continuation of Stalinism) and intellectual thought (i.e. structuralism, especially the work of Louis Althusser).

In 1961, Lefebvre became professor of sociology at the University of Strasbourg, before joining the faculty at the new university at Nanterre in 1965. He was one of the most respected professors, and he had influenced and analysed the May 1968 student revolt. Lefebvre introduced the concept of the right to the city in his 1968 book Le Droit à la ville (the publication of the book predates the May 1968 revolts which took place in many French cities). Following the publication of this book, Lefebvre wrote several influential works on cities, urbanism, and space, including The Production of Space (1974), which became one of the most influential and heavily cited works of urban theory. By the 1970s, Lefebvre had also published some of the first critical statements on the work of post-structuralists, especially Michel Foucault. During the following years he was involved in the editorial group of Arguments, a New Left magazine which largely served to enable the French public to familiarize themselves with Central European revisionism.

Lefebvre died in 1991. In his obituary, Radical Philosophy magazine honored his long and complex career and influence:

The critique of everyday life

One of Lefebvre's most important contributions to social thought is the idea of the "critique of everyday life", which he pioneered in the 1930s. Lefebvre defined everyday life dialectically as the intersection of "illusion and truth, power and helplessness; the intersection of the sector man controls and the sector he does not control", and is where the perpetually transformative conflict occurs between diverse, specific rhythms: the body's polyrhythmic bundles of natural rhythms, physiological (natural) rhythms, and social rhythms (Lefebvre and Régulier, 1985: 73). The everyday was, in short, the space in which all life occurred, and between which all fragmented activities took place. It was the residual. While the theme presented itself in many works, it was most notably outlined in his eponymous three-volume study, which came out in individual installments, decades apart, in 1947, 1961, and 1981.

Lefebvre argued that everyday life was an underdeveloped sector compared to technology and production, and moreover that in the mid 20th century, capitalism changed such that everyday life was to be colonized—turned into a zone of sheer consumption. In this zone of everydayness (boredom) shared by everyone in society regardless of class or specialty, autocritique of everyday realities of boredom vs. societal promises of free time and leisure, could lead to people understanding and then revolutionizing their everyday lives. This was essential to Lefebvre because everyday life was where he saw capitalism surviving and reproducing itself. Without revolutionizing everyday life, capitalism would continue to diminish the quality of everyday life, and inhibit real self-expression. The critique of everyday life was crucial because it was for him only through the development of the conditions of human life—rather than abstract control of productive forces—that humans could reach a concrete utopian existence.

Lefebvre's work on everyday life was heavily influential in French theory, particularly for the Situationists, as well as in politics (e.g. for the May 1968 student revolts).

The social production of space

Lefebvre dedicated a great deal of his philosophical writings to understanding the importance of (the production of) space in what he called the reproduction of social relations of production.

Lefebvre contends that there are different modes of production of space (i.e. spatialization) from natural space ('absolute space') to more complex spaces and flows whose meaning is produced in a social way (i.e. social space). Lefebvre analyzes each historical mode as a three-part dialectic between everyday practices and perceptions, representations or theories of space and the spatial imaginary of the time.

Lefebvre's argument in The Production of Space is that space is a social product, or a complex social construction (based on values, and the social production of meanings) which affects spatial practices and perceptions. Lefebvre argued that every society—and, therefore, every mode of production—produces a certain space, its own space. 

Lefebvre's concept has been criticised: e.g. in The Urban Question, Manuel Castells. Many responses to Castells are provided in The Survival of Capitalism, and some such as Andy Merrifield argue that the acceptance of those critiques in the academic world would be a motive for Lefebvre's effort in writing the long and theoretically dense The Production of Space. In "Actually-Existing Success: Economics, Aesthetics, and the Specificity of (Still-)Socialist Urbanism," Michal Murawski critiques Lefebvre's dismissal of actually existing socialism by showing how socialist states produced differential space.

Bibliography 
1925 "Positions d'attaque et de défense du nouveau mysticisme", Philosophies 5–6 (March). pp. 471–506. (Pt. 2 of the "Philosophy of Consciousness" (Philosophie de la conscience) project on being, consciousness and identity, originally proposed as a DES thesis to Léon Brunschvicg and eventually abandoned—Lefebvre's DES 1920 thesis was titled Pascal et Jansénius (Pascal and Jansenius).)
1934 with Norbert Guterman, Morceaux choisis de Karl Marx, Paris: NRF (numerous reprintings).
1936 with Norbert Guterman, La Conscience mystifiée, Paris: Gallimard (new ed. Paris: Le Sycomore, 1979).
1937 Le nationalisme contre les nations (Preface by Paul Nizan), Paris: Éditions sociales internationales (reprinted, Paris: Méridiens-Klincksliek, 1988, Collection "Analyse institutionnelle", Présentation M. Trebitsch, Postface Henri Lefebvre).
1938 Hitler au pouvoir, bilan de cinq années de fascisme en Allemagne, Paris: Bureau d'Éditions.
1938 with Norbert Guterman, Morceaux choisis de Hegel, Paris: Gallimard (3 reprintings 1938–1939; in the reprinted Collection "Idées", 2 vols. 1969).
1938 with Norbert Guterman, Cahiers de Lénine sur la dialectique de Hegel, Paris: Gallimard.
1939 Nietzsche, Paris: Éditions sociales internationales.
1946 L'Existentialisme, Paris: Éditions du Sagittaire.
1947 Logique formelle, logique dialectique, Vol. 1 of A la lumière du matérialisme dialectique, written in 1940–41 (2nd volume censored). Paris: Éditions sociales.
1947 Descartes, Paris: Éditions Hier et Aujourd'hui.
1947 Critique de la vie quotidienne, L'Arche
1942 Le Don Juan du Nord, Europe – revue mensuelle 28, April 1948, pp. 73–104.
1950 Knowledge and Social Criticism, Philosophic Thought in France and the USA Albany N.Y.: State University of New York Press. pp. 281–300 (2nd ed. 1968).
1958 Problèmes actuels du marxisme, Paris: Presses universitaires de France; 4th edition, 1970, Collection "Initiation philosophique"
1958 (with Lucien Goldmann, Claude Roy, Tristan Tzara) Le romantisme révolutionnaire, Paris: La Nef.
1961 Critique de la vie quotidienne II, Fondements d'une sociologie de la quotidienneté, Paris: L'Arche.
1963 La vallée de Campan - Etude de sociologie rurale, Paris: Presses Universitaires de France.
1965 Métaphilosophie, foreword by Jean Wahl, Paris: Éditions de Minuit, Collection "Arguments".
1965 La Proclamation de la Commune, Paris: Gallimard, Collection "Trente Journées qui ont fait la France".
1968 Le Droit à la ville, Paris: Anthropos (2nd ed.); Paris: Ed. du Seuil, Collection "Points".
1968 La vie quotidienne dans le monde moderne, Paris: Gallimard, Collection "Idées". Trans. Sacha Rabinovitch as Everyday Life in the Modern World. Allen Lane The Penguin Press, 1971. 
1968 Dialectical Materialism, first published 1940 by Presses Universitaires de France, as Le Matérialisme Dialectique. First English translation published 1968 by Jonathan Cape Ltd. 
1968 Sociology of Marx, N. Guterman trans. of 1966c, New York: Pantheon.
1969 The Explosion: From Nanterre to the Summit, Paris: Monthly Review Press. Originally published 1968.
1970 La révolution urbaine Paris: Gallimard, Collection "Idées".
1970 Du rural à l'urbain  Paris: Anthropos. 
1971 Le manifeste différentialiste, Paris: Gallimard, Collection "Idées".
1971 Au-delà du structuralisme, Paris: Anthropos.
1972 La pensée marxiste et la ville, Tournai and Paris: Casterman.
1973 La survie du capitalisme; la re-production des rapports de production. Trans. Frank Bryant as The Survival of Capitalism. London: Allison and Busby, 1976.
1974 La production de l'espace, Paris: Anthropos. Translation and Précis.
1974 with Leszek Kołakowski  Evolution or Revolution, F. Elders, ed. Reflexive Water: The Basic Concerns of Mankind, London: Souvenir. pp. 199–267. 
1975 Hegel, Marx, Nietzsche, ou le royaume des ombres, Paris: Tournai, Casterman. Collection "Synthèses contemporaines". 
1975 Le temps des méprises: Entretiens avec Claude Glayman, Paris: Stock. 
1978 with Catherine Régulier La révolution n'est plus ce qu'elle était, Paris: Éditions Libres-Hallier (German trans. Munich, 1979). 
1978 Les contradictions de l'Etat moderne, La dialectique de l'Etat, Vol. 4 of 4 De 1'Etat, Paris: UGE, Collection "10/18".
1980 La présence et l'absence, Paris: Casterman. 
1981 Critique de la vie quotidienne, III. De la modernité au modernisme (Pour une métaphilosophie du quotidien) Paris: L'Arche.
1981 De la modernité au modernisme: pour une métaphilosophie du quotidien, Paris: L'Arche Collection "Le sens de la marché".
1985 with Catherine Régulier-Lefebvre, Le projet rythmanalytique Communications 41. pp. 191–199.
1986 with Serge Renaudie and Pierre Guilbaud, "International Competition for the New Belgrade Urban Structure Improvement", in Autogestion, or Henri Lefebvre in New Belgrade, Vancouver: Fillip Editions. 
1988 Toward a Leftist Cultural Politics: Remarks Occasioned by the Centenary of Marx's Death, D. Reifman trans., L.Grossberg and C.Nelson (eds.) Marxism and the Interpretation of Culture, Urbana: University of Illinois Press; New York: Macmillan. pp. 75–88. 
1990 Du Contrat de Citoyenneté, Paris: Syllepse, 1990.
1991 The Critique of Everyday Life, Volume 1, John Moore trans., London: Verso. Originally published 1947. 
1991 with Patricia Latour and Francis Combes, Conversation avec Henri Lefebvre P. Latour and F. Combes, eds. Paris: Messidor, Collection "Libres propos".
1991 The Production of Space, Donald Nicholson-Smith trans., Oxford: Basil Blackwell. Originally published 1974. 
1992 with Catherine Regulier-Lefebvre Éléments de rythmanalyse: Introduction à la connaissance des rythmes, preface by René Lorau, Paris: Ed. Syllepse, Collection "Explorations et découvertes". English translation: Rhythmanalysis: Space, time and everyday life, Stuart Elden, Gerald Moore trans. Continuum, New York, 2004.
1995 Introduction to Modernity: Twelve Preludes September 1959-May 1961, J. Moore, trans., London: Verso. Originally published 1962. 
1996 Writings on Cities, Eleonore Kofman and Elizabeth Lebas, trans. and eds., Oxford: Basil Blackwell. 
2003 Key Writings, Stuart Elden, Elizabeth Lebas, Eleonore Kofman, eds. London/New York: Continuum.
2009 State, Space, World: Selected Essay, Neil Brenner, Stuart Elden, eds. Gerald Moore, Neil Brenner, Stuart Elden trans. Minneapolis: University of Minnesota Press.
2014 Toward an Architecture of Enjoyment., L. Stanek ed., R. Bononno trans. (Minneapolis: University of Minnesota Press), the first publication in any language of the book written in 1973.

References

Sources
 Stuart Elden, Understanding Henri Lefebvre: Theory and the Possible, London/New York: Continuum, 2004.
 Alan D. Schrift, Twentieth-Century French Philosophy: Key Themes And Thinkers, Blackwell Publishing, 2006.

Further reading
Andy Merrifield, Henri Lefebvre: A Critical Introduction (London: Routledge, 2006)
Goonewardena, K., Kipfer, S., Milgrom, R. & Schmid, C. eds. Space, Difference, Everyday Life: Reading Henri Lefebvre. (New York: Routledge, 2008)
Sue Middleton, Henri Lefebvre and Education: Space, History, Theory (New York: Routledge, 2016)
Andrzej Zieleniec: Space and Social Theory, London 2007, p. 60–97.
Derek R. Ford, Education and the Production of Space: Political Pedagogy, Geography, and Urban Revolution (New York: Routledge, 2017)
Chris Butler, Henri Lefebvre: Spatial Politics, Everyday Life, and the Right to the City (New York/London: Routledge, 2012)
Shields, R.,Lefebvre, Love, and Struggle(New York/London: Routledge, 1998)

External links 

"The Ignored Philosopher and Social Theorist: The Work of Henri Lefebvre" by Stanley Aronowitz, in: Situations, vol. 2, no. 1, pp. 133–155 (PDF available).
Henri Lefebvre, Urban Research and Architecture Today
Review of The Production of Space in Not Bored
Review of The First Situationist Symphony in Not Bored
"La Somme et la Reste" Newsletter (in French) 
"Henri Lefebvre: Philosopher of Everyday Life" (2001) by Rob Shields
Lefebvre, Love and Struggle - Spatial Dialectics (London: Routledge 1999) by Rob Shields Includes largely complete bibliography of Henri Lefebvre's work.
Review of Lefebvre, Love and Struggle
"An English Précis of Henri Lefebvre's La Production de l'Espace" Urban and Regional Studies Working Paper (Sussex University 1986) by Rob Shields
"Bioinformatic Alignments" by Jordan Crandall
"Central Europe and the Nationalist Paradigm" (University of Texas at Austin 1996) by Katherine Arens
"La Méthode d'Henri Lefebvre" in Multitudes by Rémi Hess (in French)
Stadt, Raum und Gesellschaft: Henri Lefebvre und die Theorie der Produktion des Raumes by Christian Schmid (in German)
"Postmodern Spacings" in Postmodern Culture by Mark Nunes et al.
"Towards a Heuristic Method: Sartre and Lefebvre" by Michael Kelly in Sartre Studies International, vol. 5, no. 1, 1999, pp. 1–15.
Henri Lefebvre on Space Architecture, Urban Research, and the Production of Theory by Lukasz Stanek

1901 births
1991 deaths
20th-century atheists
20th-century French philosophers
Anti-consumerists
Atheist philosophers
Continental philosophers
Critics of postmodernism
French atheists
French Communist Party members
French literary critics
French male writers
French sociologists
Marxist humanists
Marxist theorists
People from Landes (department)
Philosophers of technology
Social philosophers
Theoretical historians
University of Paris alumni
Academic staff of the University of Paris
Academic staff of the University of Strasbourg
Urban sociologists
Urban theorists